The Rubik R-07a Tücsök and R-07b Vöcsök were two versions of a Hungarian primary trainer, differing most obviously in the pilot's seating. First flown in the late 1930s, about 530 were built, some remaining in service into the 1960s.

Design and development

The first primary glider designed and built by the MSrE (Müegyetemi Sportrepülő Egyesület or in English the Technical University's Sports Flying Group)  was the EMESE-B. It was designed to have better performance than existing examples of this class but did not prove popular. One of its designers was Ernő Rubik who used this experience to produce the R-05 Vöcsök, a simpler, lower performance aircraft. Like the EMESE-B it was a typical open frame (uncovered flat girder fuselage) glider with its wing mounted on top of the girder and strut-braced. This prototype proved very successful. Production aircraft were designated R-07 with the name Vöcsök if the pilot's seat was enclosed within a nacelle as it had been on the EMESE-B. R-07s with the seat completely exposed had the name Tücsök. This naming convention was maintained through the R-06 Csóvöcsök, a later, one-off tube (csó) steel fuselage version.

The R-07 models, whether Vöcsöks or Tücsöks, were all-wood aircraft, with a wing built around two spars and rectangular in plan out to blunted tips. The forward spar was close to the plywood-covered leading edge and the rest of the wing was fabric-covered. Broad chord ailerons filled the outer 40% of the span. The post-war R-07D Vöcsök introduced Frise ailerons. The wing was braced with streamlined steel V-struts to the lower fuselage.

A flat, wooden, diagonally-braced girder formed the fuselage of all R-07s, with a deepened, ply-covered forward lower chord, longeron or keel which supported the wing struts, the pilot's seat and controls and, on its underside, a rubber sprung landing skid. On Vöcsöks the keel also supported a ply nacelle which enclosed the pilot, with fabric covering behind it to the first diagonal fuselage member. At the rear there was a narrow fin mounting a deep, fabric-covered balanced rudder with a trapezoidal profile. A roughly triangular tailplane was mounted on the top of the fuselage and forward of the rudder post. It was fabric-covered apart from a ply leading edge and carried constant chord elevators separated by a small nick for rudder movement.

Operational history

Despite the large number built (c.530 including all variants), remaining in use from 1938 to the early 60s, little is recorded in English about individual examples or their distribution over Hungarian aeroclubs. A 1981 replica R-07b, HA-2336, remained active until at least 2008.

Aircraft on display

 R-07b Vöcsök HA-2254, Kzlekedesi Muzeum, Budapest.

Variants
R-05 Vöcsök First prototype, with nacelle. First flown 1 October 1937.
R-06 Csóvöcsök Steel tube fuselage. First flown in 1939.
R-07a Tücsök Production model with no seat enclosure. Fin area reduced by cropping to lower longeron; rudder similarly cropped with compensation extension of upper tip. First flown 20 March 1938. 178 built by Aero Ever Kft, Esztergom
R-07b Vöcsök Production model with nacelle, greater span and length, increasing performance. First flight 1938. About 300 built, mostly by Aero Ever Kft but also including 12 by the Transylvanian Aircraft Plant, Nagyvárad Oradea. 
R-07D Vöcsök 1955-6 production batch of 30 examples built by the Experimental Aircraft Plant of the Hungarian Aeronautical Association (MRSz), Dunakesziwith. Fitted with Frise ailerons. In use into early 1960s.

Specifications (R-07 Vöcsök)

References

Aircraft first flown in 1937
1930s Hungarian sailplanes
Rubik aircraft
High-wing aircraft